Kébé is a West African surname that may refer to:

 Ali Ibra Kébé Baye (born 1978), Senegalese footballer
 Alioune Kébé (born 1984), Senegalese footballer
 Boubacar Kébé (born 1987), Burkinabé footballer of Malian descent
 Jimmy Kébé (born 1984), Malian footballer
 Pape Maguette Kebe (born 1979), Senegalese footballer
 Yahia Kébé (born 1985), Burkinabé footballer of Malian descent

Surnames of African origin